Caleremaeidae is a family of mites belonging to the order Sarcoptiformes.

Genera:
 Anderemaeus Hammer, 1958
 Caleremaeus Berlese, 1910
 Caucaseremaeus Subías & Shtanchaeva, 2006
 Cristeremaeus Balogh & Csiszár, 1963
 Epieremulus Berlese, 1916
 Luxtoneremaeus Balogh, 1992
 Megeremaeus Higgins & Woolley, 1965
 Veloppia Hammer, 1955
 Yungaseremaeus Balogh & Mahunka, 1969

References

Sarcoptiformes